Chuck Zehner (January 9, 1942 - December 2, 2000) was the producer and host of the PBS/Milwaukee Public Television series Tracks Ahead. He hosted the show from 1990–2000. He died on December 2, 2000 of a heart attack in South Milwaukee, Wisconsin. After his death, Spencer Christian took over and is the current host of Tracks Ahead.

Tracks Ahead 

At the dawn of cable television, Zehner, a Milwaukee train enthusiast, began producing and hosting the interview format show Just Trains on Milwaukee's local access channel on Viacom Cable. Eventually the show was picked up on the cable network around Milwaukee, After 72 shows Milwaukee's WMVS Channel 10 (PBS) agreed to air a new magazine format show On Track in the Milwaukee market. For the second season it was renamed Tracks Ahead and expanded to the PBS network.

External links

1942 births
2000 deaths
People from South Milwaukee, Wisconsin